is one of the Dōzen Islands in the Oki archipelago in the Sea of Japan.

The island, 13.7 km2 in area, has a population of approximately 650 persons and is the smallest of the inhabited islands in the Oki archipelago in area and in population Administratively the island is administered by the village of Chibu in Shimane Prefecture. Much of the island is within the borders of Daisen-Oki National Park.
Chibujima is the only island of the Oki Islands with tanuki. There are only about 650 people but probably more than 2000 tanuki.

Geography
These islands were formed when the caldera of single ancient volcanic island collapsed, leaving three islands in a ring formation.

Chiburijima is generally mountainous, but the south central area is somewhat flat. There are a number of sea cliffs, particularly on the western side of the island which faces the open expanse of the Sea of Japan.

As an island located in the Sea of Japan, Chibujima is within the Sea of Japan climate zone. Summers temperatures, though usually mild, are exacerbated by high humidity. Winter temperatures are also generally mild, though exacerbated by strong wind. The surrounding ocean has a warming effect, making winters milder than the mainland. Consequently, there is very little snow on Chibujima, and what snow does fall usually melts quickly.

Etymology of Chiburijima
Over time, Chiburijima has been written with various different kanji. These include the following, all of which are read "Chiburi": 知夫里, 知夫, 知夫利, 智夫, 道触 (see below), 知振, 千振, and 千波. There are two different theories regarding the name "Chiburi Island".

The first is that the name came from the name of a Shinto kami enshrined on Chiburijima's offshore isle, . The god, named , was a protector of ships. Since Chiburihuma is the closest to the mainland of the Oki Islands, ships coming to and departing from Oki would stop on Chiburijima to ask the god for a safe voyage. Over time, the name "Chiburi" stuck and the island became known as "Chiburijima".

A second theory is that the name came from the use of smoke signals sent between Chiburijima and the mainland for communication. Since Chiburijima is the closest, it was the easiest to see between the Oki Islands and the mainland.

History
The earliest evidence of human habitation of Chibujima is the tomb called  located in Urumi. The tomb is dated to the Jōmon period, 4000 years before present. Other ancient tombs built in the Yayoi (2300 BP) and Kofun (1700 BP) periods were also found. Also, the Oki Islands, including Chiburijima, are mentioned in Japan's two most ancient texts, Kojiki and Nihon Shoki. In the Asuka period, the area became incorporated into the  encompassing both Chiburi Island and Nishinoshima.
The islands have been used as a place of exile from the Nara period, but are well known as the place of exile for ex-Emperor Go-Toba, and Emperor Go-Daigo during the Kamakura period. 
After the Meiji restoration, the Oki Islands became part of Tottori Prefecture in 1871, but were transferred to Shimane Prefecture in 1881.

Modern Chibu Village was established in 1909.

Transportation
Chiburijima is connected by regular ferry service from Saigo Port on Dōgojima, as well as by direct ferry service to points on mainland Japan.

Economy
The economy of the island is based on agriculture and commercial fishing. Seasonal tourism also plays a role in the local economy.

References

External links
Travel guide

Oki Islands